Karen Lawrence is an American singer and songwriter who has worked with the L.A. Jets (1994), Karen Lawrence and the Pinz, and Blue by Nature. She sang backup vocals on "Get It Up" from the Draw the Line by Aerosmith and sang "Back on the Streets" from the Jeff Beck album Flash.

A stage performer since the age of nine, she fronted her first band, a blues outfit, at the age of 13. Front woman for the A&M band 1994: (produced by Jack Douglas). Kerrang! wrote "it was 1994's Karen Lawrence who gave the others the choice of being second best or giving up". In addition to lead vocal and writing credits on Jeff Beck's Beckology, Lawrence composed "Prisoner (Love Theme from Eyes of Laura Mars)", performed by Barbra Streisand.

Blue by Nature was formed in March 1993 when Lawrence and her collaborator of 14 years, rhythm guitarist Fred Hostetler, teamed with Rick Dufay, a former Aerosmith guitarist.

Other notable performances
Karen Lawrence sang the title song of the TV series Misfits of Science.

Discography
 L.A. Jets - L.A. Jets (1976), RCA APL1-1547
 1994: - 1994 (1978), A&M 4709
 1994: - Please Stand By (1979), A&M 4769
 Karen Lawrence and the Pinz - Girls Night Out (1981), RCA AFL1-4006
 Karen Lawrence - Rip and Tear (1986), Revolver REVLP 75
 Blue by Nature - Blue to the Bone (1995), SRD 8, Shattered 9
 Blue by Nature - Live at the Lake (1998), Hostel 55
 Blue by Nature - Hard Daze (2000), Hostel 57

References

External links
 Artist Direct Biography
 Page from the Misfits of Science Wiki on the theme song
 

Year of birth missing (living people)
Living people
American singer-songwriters